Samantha Ellis is a British playwright and writer best known for her book How to be a Heroine and her play How to Date a Feminist

Early life
Ellis was born in London to Iraqi-Jewish parents. She studied English at Queens' College, Cambridge.

Career and works
Ellis's play The Candy Jar was produced at the Edinburgh Fringe in 1996. She worked as a journalist, and wrote a column on theatrical history for The Guardian newspaper.

Her play Patching Havoc was produced at Theatre503 in 2003. Her radio play Sugar and Snow, set in the Kurdish community in north London, was produced on BBC Radio 4 in 2006 and given a reading at the Hampstead Theatre. Her short play A Sudden Visitation of Calamity was produced at Menagerie Theatre in 2008. In 2010 her play The Thousand and Second Night was produced by LAMDA. In 2010 her play Cling To Me Like Ivy, published by Nick Hern Books, was produced by the Birmingham Repertory Theatre and went on tour. In 2012 she was a founder member of women's theatre company Agent 160.

Her book How to be a Heroine was published by Chatto & Windus in January 2014, and her biography of Anne Brontë Take Courage: Anne Bronte and the Art of Life was published in January 2017.

References

External links
 Samantha Ellis's doollee page
 Samantha Ellis's website
 Agent 160

Alumni of Queens' College, Cambridge
Jewish dramatists and playwrights
Living people
1975 births
English people of Iraqi-Jewish descent
English Jewish writers
Writers from London
English women dramatists and playwrights
20th-century English dramatists and playwrights
20th-century English women writers
21st-century British dramatists and playwrights
21st-century English women writers
People educated at the City of London School for Girls
Jewish women writers